Methana is a town and a former municipality on the Peloponnese peninsula, Greece. Since the 2011 local government reform it is part of the municipality Troizinia-Methana, of which it is a municipal unit. The municipal unit has an area of 50.161 km2.

Methana is situated on a volcanic (the Methana Volcano) peninsula, attached to the Peloponnese. Administratively, it belongs to the Attica region. The town (pop. 892 in 2011) is located north of the road connecting to the rest of the Peloponnese and Galatas. The largest settlements besides the town of Methana are Vathý (pop. 129), Megalochóri (115), Kounoupítsa (75), Kypséli (47), Ágioi Theódoroi (45), and Dritsaíika (205)

Subdivisions

The municipal unit Methana is subdivided into the following communities (constituent villages in brackets):
Kounoupitsa (Kounoupitsa, Agios Georgios, Agios Nikolaos, Makrylongos, Palaia Loutra)
Kypseli (Kypseli, Agioi Theodoroi)
Loutropoli Methanon (Methana, Dritsaiika)
Megalochori (Megalochori, Vathy, Kaimeni Chora, Megalo Potami)

Historical population

Half of the entire peninsula's population lives in Methana town.

Volcanic activity

The peninsula is entirely of volcanic origin and contains over 30 volcanic eruption centers. The last volcanic eruption occurred near present-day Kameni Chora in 3rd century BC. Famous writers such as Ovid, Strabo and Pausanias reported the last volcanic eruption in Methana.  The peninsula is the northwesternmost of the arc of the Aegean islands of which the active volcanic areas are Methana, Milos, Santorini and Nisyros. In the future, Methana (and the area of the Saronic gulf) may expect other volcanic eruptions.

Geography

Since 1991, the peninsula has been investigated by the team of ETH Zürich geologically and cartographically.  From this, a topographical map of the entire peninsula at a scale of 1:25,000 was made.  An interactive 3D map was created and is on the World Wide Web. Also a rich photographic archive with about 10.000 color slides has been produced (see links below).

The panorama of the northeastern part of Argolis, southeastern and eastern Corinthia along with the southern part of the Attica peninsula and the Saronic Islands of Aegina and Salamis along with a smaller one and the mountains of the eastern tip of the neighboring peninsula.

Much of the peninsula is mountainous and bushy and grassy. The mountain range covers the central part of the peninsula and has a small ridge north of the seat. The residential area is within the sea. The pastures are around Methana.

History

The earliest known settlement (near the village of Vathy) dates from 1500–1300 BC. The first survey was conducted by Michael Deffner, who discovered a large throne, among other artefacts. Many ancient sites were identified through the archaeological survey conducted in the 1980s by the University of Liverpool in association with the British School at Athens.  The Acropolis Palaiokastro is located near the village of Vathy.  The fortress is in Kypseli at the coast Akropolis Oga at the principal pace of Nisaki (Νησάκι, meaning little island).  A Mycenaean settlement was excavated by Helene Konstolakis-Jiannopoulou in 1990 along with the chapel of Agios Konstantinos and Elenis. Selected artifacts can be visited in the museums of Poros island and in Piraeus.  This site dates between 1500 and 1300 BC.

Methana (Μεθώνη, or  Μεθήνη) was in the territory of Troezen. In his History of the Peloponnesian War, Thucydides tells of an Athenian expeditionary force under Nicias that after defeating Corinth (in 425 BC) built a wall across the isthmus to cut the Methana peninsula off from the mainland.  In the Hellenistic period, the peninsula became one of the Ptolemaic bases in the Aegean when it was renamed Arsinoe. When Pausanias visited in the 2nd century, he saw a temple of Isis, and statutes of Hermes and Heracles in the agora. Traditionally, the population of Methana were Arvanites.

Persons
Giorgos Batis (1885–1967) singer
Lina Nikolakopoulou
Paraskeuas Koutsikos

See also
List of settlements in Attica

Further reading

References

External links

Official website 
The alternative Methana Website Project
GTP Travel Pages (Community)
 Methana Volcano
Erosion of Methana
Methana Volcanoes

Spa towns in Greece
Volcanoes of Greece
Subduction volcanoes
Stratovolcanoes
Lava domes
Troizinia-Methana
Landforms of Islands (regional unit)
Landforms of Attica
Populated places in ancient Argolis
Populated places in Islands (regional unit)
Arvanite settlements